The Uzhhorod Synagogue building is located in Uzhhorod, in the present day Zakarpattia Oblast of western Ukraine.

Synagogue
The synagogue was completed and dedicated on July 27, 1904. It was then within the Kingdom of Galicia and Lodomeria within the Austro-Hungarian Empire.

The building was designed by the architects Gyula Papp and Ferenc Szabolcs, in a flamboyant Romantic style that boldly intermingled Byzantine Revival and Moorish Revival architectural elements.

Concert hall

Since World War II the building has served as Uzhhorod's concert hall, prized for its acoustics. It has housed the Regional Philharmonic Society with the Transcarpathian Folk Choir.

All Jewish symbols were removed from the building, although as of 2012 there is a plaque on the facade commemorating the 85,000 Jews from Zakarpattia Oblast who were murdered in The Holocaust. There are now plans to restore the glass dome with its mosaics.

See also
 History of the Jews in Ukraine

Gallery

References

Former synagogues in Ukraine
Synagogue
Jewish Ukrainian history
Music venues in Ukraine
1904 establishments in Austria-Hungary
1904 establishments in Ukraine
Synagogues completed in 1904
Byzantine Revival architecture in Ukraine
Moorish Revival architecture in Ukraine
Byzantine Revival synagogues
Moorish Revival synagogues
Jewish organizations established in 1904
Establishments in the Kingdom of Galicia and Lodomeria